The 2007–2008 Nazko earthquakes were a series of small volcanic earthquakes measuring less than 4.0 on the Richter magnitude scale. They took place in the sparsely populated Nazko area of the Central Interior of British Columbia, Canada starting on October 9, 2007 and ending on June 12, 2008. They occurred just west of Nazko Cone, a small tree-covered cinder cone that last erupted about 7,200 years ago.

No damage or casualties resulted from the Nazko earthquakes, which were too small to be felt by people, but local seismographs recorded them. The earthquake swarm occurred at the eastern end of a known volcanic zone called the Anahim Volcanic Belt. This is an east-west trending line of volcanic formations extending from the Central Coast to the Central Interior of British Columbia.

Geology 
The character of the seismic waves indicated that the swarm originated from a magmatic source. It could have formed as a result of rock fracturing at the tip of a dike and/or by movement along fault planes due to changes in the local stress field by the expansion and movement of magma. This magmatic activity is potentially linked to the hypothesized Anahim hotspot, a mantle plume that is probably responsible for older volcanism throughout the Anahim Volcanic Belt. This volcanic belt includes the Rainbow, Ilgachuz and Itcha range shield volcanoes west of the Nazko swarm. Because the area where the 2007–2008 Nazko earthquake swarm originated is at the eastern end of the volcanic belt, it probably represents the youngest portion of the hotspot track. This suggests any future volcanic earthquakes will occur in the Nazko region or further to the east.

Before the Nazko earthquake swarm began in 2007, the Anahim hotspot was not known to be an earthquake zone. On October 10 of the following year, a swarm of earthquakes occurred. These earthquakes were normally no more than magnitude 1.0 on the Richter magnitude scale, but at least one earthquake was as strong as magnitude 3.9. Since the appearance of the Nazko swarm, Natural Resources Canada has expressed interest in the adjacent 7,200‑year‑old Nazko Cone.

Even though earthquake swarms can be dangerous, scientists are able to model such events to analyze their structure. During the earthquake swarm in 2007, a group of scientists investigated the possibility that a volcanic eruption would occur. Five additional seismographs were placed in the earthquake zone, and scientists closely monitored the seismic activity. After additional data were gathered, scientists with the United States Geological Survey, the University of Washington, and other organizations, agreed that the Nazko earthquakes probably originated from movement of magma beneath the surface near Nazko Cone. However, because of the number and small size of the Nazko earthquakes, no volcanic eruption is likely. Other recent earthquakes in North America that have been attributed to magma but did not result in a volcanic eruption include the 2003 earthquakes under Lake Tahoe in the U.S. state of California and a 2004 earthquake swarm at Jordan Craters in the U.S. state of Oregon.

Number of earthquakes

More than 1,000 earthquakes were recorded by regional seismic networks within three weeks of October 20, 2007. Following the earthquake, five seismometers were placed by the Geological Survey of Canada from September 2007 to June 2008 close to the hypocenter. Analysis of the data recorded by these seismometers indicates a much larger total number of earthquakes. For example, at least 597 earthquakes were recognized during a period of only six hours.

At least two episodes of earthquakes constitute the Nazko swarm. In the first seismic phase from October 9 to November 1, 2007, a total of 153 earthquakes took place. During the second seismic phase between September 25, 2007 and June 12, 2008, 4,428 earthquakes occurred. These two seismic episodes were cross-correlated by scientists to understand changes in the development of the earthquake swarm. Correlation coefficients were around 1.0 for the beginnings of the periods of activity, indicating almost identical situations, and then decayed to around 0.5, indicating a decrease in similarity between the later stages of the two events.

Scientific response
The earthquake swarm was noted on October 12, 2007 in the Prince George Citizen by citizen staff, three days after the earthquakes began. Scientists mentioned in the report were seismologist John Cassidy of Natural Resources Canada and volcanologist Catherine Hickson, who was part of the Geological Survey of Canada at the time. At the time of the report, scientists did not know the origin of the swarm. Seismologist John Cassidy stated, "the depth is enough to rule out hydrothermal but it's up in the air as to whether the cause is tectonic shifts or volcanic activity. If it is volcanic there are certain characteristics that we would expect, there's a tremor-like character to it. And so we'll be looking for the types of events that we see beneath volcanoes and we'll be looking to see if they're getting closer to the surface or if they're migrating at all."

Even if the Nazko swarm were a warning of a volcanic eruption, Hickson doubted it would turn out to be a highly explosive eruption like those that can occur in subduction-zone volcanoes. "We're not talking about an injection of tonnes of ash many kilometers into the air like the 1980 Mount St. Helens eruption or the 1991 Mount Pinatubo eruption. We're talking about something very small, relatively localized that should have a fairly limited impact... but it'll be extremely exciting", Hickson said. If an eruption were to occur, Hickson suggested that it would be characterized by a lava fountain that sends globs of lava  into the air. This is similar to those that occur in Hawaii. Hickson said that a Nazko eruption could be a tourist attraction, but warned that noxious gases such as carbon dioxide and sulfur dioxide would be released during the event.

Preparedness and hazards
Because no seismographs were close enough to the Nazko swarm zone before the earthquakes began, employees of Natural Resources Canada placed seismographs in the area to monitor future earthquakes in the area more clearly. An infrasound station is also being established, which is able to measure sound waves that would normally go unnoticed by human hearing. These stations can detect volcanic eruptions and the release of gas at volcanic vents, and can be used in combination with other geophysical data to monitor fluid flow within volcanoes. Employees of Natural Resources Canada have also visited two communities that were adjacent to the 2007–2008 earthquake swarm to renew information about the Nazko swarm, collect samples, and examine some of the more poorly studied volcanic deposits in the Nazko region. The Natural Resources Canada employees also measured carbon dioxide levels during the earthquake swarm. Carbon dioxide is usually discharged at faults in volcanically active areas and can collect in soil and under snow. Because of this, carbon dioxide concentrations can provide information on volcanic activity in the subsurface. The Nazko swarm did not cause any discernible discharge of carbon dioxide, which is normal for non-eruptive events.

The 2007–2008 Nazko earthquake swarm is one of numerous seismic events that have occurred near volcanoes in British Columbia. Volcanoes that have experienced volcanic earthquakes include the Mount Meager massif (seventeen events), Mount Cayley (four events), Mount Garibaldi (three events), Silverthrone Caldera (two events), Castle Rock (two events), Hoodoo Mountain (eight events), Crow Lagoon (four events), The Volcano (five events), and the Mount Edziza volcanic complex (eight events). Seismic data suggest that these volcanoes still contain active magma chambers, indicating possible future eruptive activity. Although the available data do not allow a clear conclusion, these observations are indications that some of Canada's volcanoes may be active, with significant potential dangers. This seismic activity correlates both with some of Canada's most youthful volcanoes and with long-lived volcanoes with a history of significant explosive activity, such as Hoodoo Mountain and the Mount Edziza volcanic complex.

If magma were to rise towards the surface of Nazko, new earthquake swarms would occur, with a significant increase in the size and number of earthquakes. An eruption in the Nazko area would probably create a small cinder cone, similar to what formed Nazko Cone 7,200 years ago. Immediate hazards related to cinder cone eruptions in the Nazko area would probably be forest fires and, if an eruption column were produced, redirection of nearby air traffic.

See also
List of earthquakes in 2007
List of earthquakes in 2008
List of earthquakes in Canada
Volcanism of Canada
Volcanism of Western Canada

References

2007 earthquakes
2007 in British Columbia
2007 in science
2008 earthquakes
2008 in British Columbia
2008 in science
21st-century volcanic events
Anahim Volcanic Belt
Central Interior of British Columbia
Earthquakes in British Columbia
Holocene volcanism
Hotspot volcanism
Earthquake swarms
Volcanic earthquakes